The men's discus throw was a track & field athletics event at the 1900 Summer Olympics in Paris. It was held on July 14 and July 15, 1900. 17 discus throwers from nine nations competed. The event was won by Rudolf Bauer of Hungary, the nation's first victory in the men's discus throw (in its first appearance in the event). František Janda-Suk gave Bohemia its first medal in the event, also in that nation's first appearance. Richard Sheldon's bronze put the United States in the top three for the second consecutive Games.

Background

This was the second appearance of the event, which is one of 12 athletics events to have been held at every Summer Olympics. The top two men from 1896, Robert Garrett of the United States and Panagiotis Paraskevopoulos of Greece, returned to competition. The third-place man, Sotirios Versis of Greece, was entered but did not start.

Austria, Bohemia, and Hungary each made their debut in the men's discus throw. All six of the nations that competed in 1896 returned in 1900: Denmark, France, Great Britain, Greece, Sweden, and the United States.

Competition format

There event was described as having two rounds, but was more similar to the modern divided final (with first "round" results carried over). The format of the competition is unclear; it appears that each thrower received three throws and the finalists received three more. The top five throwers in the qualifying round qualified for the final. The throwing area was a 2.50 metre square instead of a circle. The landing area was unusually narrow ("basically a lane through two rows of trees"), causing difficulties in making legal throws.

Records

These were the standing world and Olympic records (in metres) prior to the 1900 Summer Olympics.

* unofficial

With the world now familiar with the discus, the Olympic record of 1896 was not a meaningful distance; every thrower who made a legal mark surpassed that distance. Rudolf Bauer set a new Olympic record with 36.04 metres.

Schedule

Results

All throwers competed in the qualifying round, with the top five moving on to the final. The defending champion, Garrett, kept hitting the trees with his discus, and did not achieve a legal mark. The top five throwers received additional throws on the second day. No positions changed during the final, despite the leader not being able to improve upon his qualifying marks. Throw sequences are not known. Von Lubowiecki missed the qualifying round but was permitted to throw on the second day; he did not achieve a top-five result.

References

Sources
 International Olympic Committee.
 De Wael, Herman. Herman's Full Olympians: "Athletics 1900". Accessed 18 March 2006.
 

Men's throwing discus
Discus throw at the Olympics